Ardito was the name of at least three ships of the Italian Navy and may refer to:

 , an  launched in 1912 and discarded in 1931.
 , a  launched in 1942. Seized by Germany and renamed TA26 in September 1943. She was sunk in 1944.
 , an  launched in 1971 and decommissioned in 2006.

Italian Navy ship names